Diodora canariensis is a species of sea snail, a marine gastropod mollusk in the family Fissurellidae, the keyhole limpets.

Description
The size of the shell reaches 8 mm.

Distribution
This species occurs in the Atlantic Ocean off the Canary Islands.

References

External links
 

Fissurellidae
Gastropods described in 2007